Avatar was released in December 2009 and went on to break multiple box office records in various markets. Worldwide, it became the highest-grossing movie of all time and the fastest movie to gross $1 billion through $2.5 billion, while also setting the records for the highest grosses in the 3D and IMAX formats, respectively. In its domestic market of the United States and Canada, it set the records for the highest-grossing film and second through seventh weekends, as well as the fastest to gross $500 million through $750 million. Elsewhere, it became the highest-grossing film of all time in over 30 markets including China, Hong Kong, Romania, South Korea, Taiwan, and the United Kingdom.

Box office analysts identified several factors contributing to the film's box office success. Among these were the relative lack of competition owing to the release date, a marketing strategy that emphasized the novelty of the cinematic experience leading viewers to watch it in the theater rather than at home, positive word of mouth and repeat viewings increasing the film's staying power in cinemas, an ability to attract audiences across the globe, and premium ticket prices from 3D and IMAX showings. Many of the records set by the film are listed below. Data on the previous record and records that have since been surpassed are presented where available and applicable. All grosses are given in unadjusted US dollars, except where noted otherwise.

Worldwide 
The film set the worldwide record for the highest gross of all time, surpassing the previous record by more than 50%, and grossed $2 billion in less time than it had taken the previous fastest-grossing film to gross half as much. It also exceeded the previous record for highest gross in the IMAX format by a factor of more than three.

United States and Canada
In the domestic market, Avatar set the record for the highest-grossing film of all time as well as several weekend records. It also set speed records for grosses at and above $500 million, and had the widest IMAX and 3D releases of any film up to that time.

Other territories
Avatar became the highest-grossing movie of all time in more than 30 markets spanning all six continents (not counting Antarctica). Data on precise figures, previous record holders, and surpassed records is limited due to the absence of box office record trackers for these markets.

References 

Box Office Records
Avatar